The Threat is a 1960 American crime film directed by Charles R. Rondeau, written by Jo Heims, and starring Robert Knapp, Linda Lawson, Lisabeth Hush, James Seay, Mary Castle and Barney Phillips. It was released by Warner Bros. on March 12, 1960.

Plot
Hotheaded cynical loner cop Steve Keenan (Robert Knapp) starts getting anonymous threats from someone who is upset with the fact that he killed a gangster kingpin in self-defense. Steve is casually seeing a beautiful torch singer named Gerri (Linda Lawson), who is in love with him and wishes he would commit to her. Steve is hesitant to do that, because he is still feeling burned about his ex Laura (Mary Castle) leaving him and taking up with the now-deceased gangster. His brother (and fellow cop) Harry (James Seay) tries to get him to take the threats seriously, but he just brushes them off until things start taking a deadly turn...

Cast   
 Robert Knapp as Steve Keenan
 Linda Lawson as Gerri
 Lisabeth Hush as Sandy
 James Seay as Harry Keenan
 Mary Castle as Laura Wallace
 Barney Phillips as Lucky
 Richard Cowl as Chessner
 Lew Brown as Jim Smiley
 Art Lewis as Mousie
 Tom Gilson as Junior
 Emile Meyer as Duncan
 Nicholas King as Georgie
 Alfred Shelly as Chessner Henchman
 Ric Roman as Lucky's Underworld Contact
 Bert Rumsey as Bert the Bartender

References

External links
 
 
 
 

1960 films
1960 crime drama films
1960s police films
American black-and-white films
American crime drama films
Films scored by Ronald Stein
Films with screenplays by Jo Heims
Warner Bros. films
1960s English-language films
1960s American films